William T. Sullivan (April 6, 1894 – March 21, 1968) was a member of the Wisconsin State Assembly.

Biography
Sullivan was born on April 6, 1894 in Oconto, Wisconsin. He graduated from Oconto High School before attending the University of Wisconsin-Madison, the University of Wisconsin-Oshkosh and Lawrence University. He taught in various schools until he was appointed director of the Kaukauna Vocational School in 1927, a position he held until he entered politics in 1954. During World War I and World War II, Sullivan served in the United States Navy, reaching the rank of lieutenant commander. Sullivan was a member of the American Legion, the Forty and Eight, the Benevolent and Protective Order of Elks and the Knights of Columbus. He died at a hospital in Madison on March 21, 1968.

Political career
Sullivan was elected to the Assembly in 1954, 1956 and 1958. He was a Republican.

References

See also
The Political Graveyard

People from Oconto, Wisconsin
Catholics from Wisconsin
Republican Party members of the Wisconsin State Assembly
Military personnel from Wisconsin
20th-century American naval officers
United States Navy personnel of World War I
United States Navy personnel of World War II
University of Wisconsin–Madison alumni
University of Wisconsin–Oshkosh alumni
Lawrence University alumni
1894 births
1968 deaths
20th-century American politicians